Lidio John Fogolin Sr. (February 27, 1927 — November 29, 2000) was a Canadian professional ice hockey player for the Detroit Red Wings and Chicago Black Hawks of the National Hockey League (NHL) between 1948 and 1956.

Playing career
Fogolin started his professional career with the Omaha Knights of the United States Hockey League in 1946. The next year he played for the Indianapolis Capitals of the American Hockey League. He saw his first NHL action for the Detroit Red Wings in the 1948 playoffs. He began the 1949 season with Indianapolis before being called up to the NHL full-time.

He played the next three seasons with Detroit winning the Stanley Cup with them in 1950. In 1951 he was traded to the Chicago Black Hawks along with Steve Black for Bert Olmstead and Vic Stasiuk. He played the final six years of his career on less-than-impressive Black Hawks teams. In 1957, he signed on as a player-coach of the Calgary Stampeders of the Western Hockey League (WHL). He broke his elbow that season and decided to retire at its conclusion to concentrate on coaching full-time.

Coaching career
Fogolin coached one season in the WHL in 1957. He did not return to coaching until 1971 with the Thunder Bay Twins of the United States Hockey League, where he coached for three seasons.

Personal life
Fogolin played in two NHL All Star Games, in 1950 and 1951. His son Lee Fogolin won the Stanley Cup two times, with the Edmonton Oilers in 1984 and 1985. His grandson Michael Fogolin played for the Prince George Cougars in the WHL and died in his sleep on May 26, 2004 of a possible heart condition.

Fogolin died November 29, 2000.

Career statistics

Regular season and playoffs

References

External links
 
 Picture of Lee Fogolin's Name on the 1950 Stanley Cup Plaque

1927 births
2000 deaths
Calgary Stampeders (ice hockey) players
Canadian ice hockey defencemen
Chicago Blackhawks players
Detroit Red Wings players
Galt Red Wings players
Ice hockey people from Ontario
Indianapolis Capitals players
Omaha Knights (USHL) players
Sportspeople from Thunder Bay
Stanley Cup champions